Disney's All-Star Movies Resort is a resort hotel located at the Walt Disney World Resort. It is one of five Disney Resorts in the "Value" category along with Disney's All-Star Sports Resort, Disney's All-Star Music Resort, Disney's Pop Century Resort, and Disney's Art of Animation Resort. The resort is located on the southern portion of the Walt Disney World property, and has a Disney Movie theme. Like all Disney Value resorts, the property is decorated with giant Disney film icons such as the Fantasia Pool; a Mighty Ducks-themed Duck Pond Pool; Herbie, The Love Bug; puppies from One Hundred and One Dalmatians; and some of the residents of Andy's Room from Pixar's Toy Story. Like the other value resorts, the All-Star Movies has a large food court and poolside bar.

Most rooms are available with two queen beds. A limited number of rooms with king-size beds are also available. Disabled accessible rooms are available. Irons, ironing boards, mini-refrigerators and hair dryers, and in-room safes are in each room.

As with the other All-Star resorts, it was designed by Arquitectonica.

Dining and shopping
 World Premiere Food Court
 Silver Screen Spirits Bar
 Donald's Double Feature store
 Reel Fun Arcade

Disney transportation 
Disney's All-Star Resorts are connected via bus to the various theme parks and activities located throughout the resort complex.

References

External links 

 

All-Star Movies Resort
Hotel buildings completed in 1999
Hotels established in 1999
1999 establishments in Florida